The 1966 Northern Arizona Lumberjacks football team was an American football team that represented Northern Arizona University (NAU) as an independent during the 1966 NCAA College Division football season. In their second year under head coach Andy MacDonald, the Lumberjacks compiled a 6–4 record and outscored opponents by a total of 202 to 159.

The team played its home games at Lumberjack Stadium in Flagstaff, Arizona.

Schedule

References

Northern Arizona
Northern Arizona Lumberjacks football seasons
Northern Arizona Lumberjacks football